Michael Robert DeLuise (born August 4, 1969) is an American actor, film director, and film producer best known as Tony Piccolo in ‘’seaQuest DSV’’ (1994-1996), Officer Joey Penhall in ‘’21 Jump Street’’ (1990-1991), TJ in ‘’Gilmore Girls’’ (2004-2007).

Early life, family, and education

Michael DeLuise was born in Los Angeles, California, the second son of actor and comedian Dom DeLuise and actress Carol Arthur, and the brother of actor, writer, director Peter DeLuise and actor David DeLuise.

Career
DeLuise made his film debut in 1979 opposite his father in the 1979 comedy Hot Stuff.

In 1990 he landed his first major role, on the Fox TV series 21 Jump Street. He played Officer Joey Penhall, the younger brother of his brother Peter DeLuise's role, Officer Doug Penhall. He and Peter were also on SeaQuest DSV, where Michael played Tony Piccolo from 1994 to 1996. He made recurring appearances as TJ on the TV series Gilmore Girls and as Andy Sipowicz's older son on the TV series NYPD Blue. He has also made guest appearances on CSI: NY, Lost, and Stargate SG-1.

He played Alan, one of Wayne's headbanger friends in Wayne's World, and Matt, the school bully and primary villain in Encino Man.

Filmography

References

External links

1969 births
American people of Italian descent
American male film actors
American male television actors
Film producers from California
Male actors from Los Angeles
Living people
Film directors from California
DeLuise family